WJJJ is a Religious formatted broadcast radio station licensed to Beckley, West Virginia, serving the Beckley/Princeton/Hinton area.  WJJJ is owned and operated by Shofar Broadcasting Corporation.

External links
 88.1 WJJJ Online
 
 
 

JJJr
2007 establishments in West Virginia
Radio stations established in 2007
Beckley, West Virginia